Hanan Rubinstein is an American, New York City-based multi-instrumentalist, vocal coach, record producer and audio engineer. Hanan is the co-owner/chief engineer of Daxxit Studios in Fort Lee, New Jersey.

Career
In 2001, after graduating from Tenafly High School, Hanan began working at Unique Recording Studios as a sound engineer. He was also attending the Conservatory Of Music at SUNY Purchase and touring with Leela James as a guitarist and backup vocalist.

In 2004,  after graduating from Purchase College, Hanan began working with other artists such as Kanye West, Motown's Funk Brothers, Roy Hargrove and DMX. In 2005 while playing at Montreux Jazz Festival, Hanan met his future management, which resulted in him moving to Berlin, Germany in 2007. In Berlin, Hanan was the chief engineer of "The HUB" studios where he recorded his debut album, "The Year I Lived" and opened for artists such as ZZ top, Chris Isaak, Jamie Cullum, Jeff Beck and many more. In Berlin, he also spent 5 years studying the Bel Canto voice method under maestro Jonathan Kinsler.

In early 2011, Hanan moved back to New York, and began working with Rita Ora as a guitarist and a vocal coach. In June 2011, Hanan was asked to join the Alicia Keys band, as the lead guitarist with whom he played until 2020 

Some other notable artists that Hanan has worked with include Ed Sheeran, Bonnie Raitt, Carole King, John Legend, Charlie Puth, David Byrne, James "JT" Taylor, Lenny Kravitz, Keisha Cole, Nas, Ellie Goulding, Liam Payne, Nick Jonas, KRS-One, Roy Ayers, Jamie Foxx, Jazmine Sullivan, The Funk Brothers, Jeff Richmond, The Roots and Jennifer Hudson.

Selected discography
 "Mulligan" - Netflix, 2023 - Theme song and various in episode music - Production, Multi-instrumentalist and Mixing
 “Girls 5 Eva" season 2 - Peacock, 2022 - Theme song, and all episodic songs, soundtrack - Production, Multi-instrumentalist, Mixing 
 “Postcard” - Itai, 2021 - Production, Multi-instrumentalist, Mixing 
 “Girls 5 Eva" season 1 - Peacock, 2021 - Theme song, and all episodic songs, soundtrack - Production, Multi-instrumentalist, Mixing 
 “Mr. Mayor" - NBC, 2021 - Theme song and various in episode music - Production, Multi-instrumentalist and Mixing 
 “Midnight Epiphanies” - Emclay 2021 - Production, Multi-instrumentalist, Mixing 
 “Can You Blame Me” - Emclay, 2020 - Production, Multi-instrumentalist, Mixing
 “Champagne Dreams” - Gabi Demartino, 2020 - Production, Multi-instrumentalist, Mixing, Mastering 
 "Bad Boy, Bad Girl" - Jammes Nova, 2020 - Co-production
 "Rain On Your Parade" - Nick Klyne, 8 Ball music 2020 - Mixing , Mastering 
 "Love Frequency" - Zalman Krause, 2020 - Production, Multi-instrumentalist, Mixing, Mastering
 "There's a light" - Owls and Lions, 2019 - Production, Multi-instrumentalist, Mixing
 "The Surfintynes" - The Surfintynes, 2019 - Mastering 
 “Gone” - Emclay, 2018 - Production, Multi-instrumentalist, Mixing 
 “Before Anythang” - The Cash Money Story, Apple Music, 2018 - Mixing and sound design 
 ”Wash Dish, Bish” - Great News, NBC 2017 - Mixing 
 "Hell No" - Unbreakable Kimmy Schmidt, 2017 - Mix Engineer (Emmy Nominated)
 "The Mujician" - "Stay This way" (Feat Bilal Oliver and Big K.R.I.T) - Keyon Harrold, Sony 2017 - Guitar 
 “Fully Committed” - Jesse Tyler Ferguson, Broadway 2016 - Mix Engineer, Drum Programming
 "Max Jury" - Max Jury, Marathon Artists, 2016 - Guitar
 "Unbreakable Kimmy Schmidt" Theme Song, various in episode songs, all seasons 2015  - Mix Engineer 
 "Gotcha Rhythm Right Here" - John Tropea, Stp Record, 2014 - Guitar, Mix Engineer 
 "Twisted Ukulele" - Willie K., Maui Tribe Productions, 2013 - Producer, Engineer, Guitar, Drums, Piano, Bass 
 "VH1 Storytellers" - Alicia Keys, RCA records, 2013 - Guitar 
 "Crooked Smile" – J. Cole feat. TLC, Single, Born Sinner, Roc Nation, 2013 - Recording Engineer, Vocal Editing, Sound Design. 
 "Was Ich Will" -  Henrik Kaethe, Be People, 2012 - Producer, Engineer, Guitars, Piano   
 "We're All In This Together" - Lalah Hathaway, Shelby J, Take 6, Anthony Hamilton, Crazy Ned, 2012 - Mix Engineer
 "Kill Your Babies" - Filmscore For An Unknown Picture by Malakoff Kowalski, 2012- Piano, Mastering Engineer, Co-Composer ("Autumn in Berlin") 
 "Festivals Of The Wicked" - Iced Earth, Century Media, 2011 - Mix Engineer, Mastering Engineer. 
 "Awaken" - Elite, 2011 - Guitars  
 "Rendered Waters" - Kingdom Come, Steamhammer Records 2011 - Mastering
 "Neue Deutsche Reiselieder" - Malakoff Kowalski, Das Kowalski Komitee / EMI Music, 2009 - Co-Producer, Engineer, Drums, Guitars 
 "Wrong or Right" – DMX feat. Bazaar Royale, Year of the Dog (Again), Ruff Ryders / Sony, 2006 - Guitars 
 "Shoot Outs" – Jadakiss, Kiss of Death, Ruff Ryders / Interscope, 2004 - Guitars, Synths, Drums, Sound Design

Equipment
 Waves Audio Plugins
 Eventide Plugins 
 Old Moon Guitars 
 D'Angelico Guitars
 Taylor Guitars
 MojoTone Amps and Pickups 
 DR Strings
 Reunion Blues gig bags 
 Glab switching systems and effect pedals
 Eventide effect pedals 
 Visual Sound effect pedals  
 Moollon effects pedals 
 Walrus Audio effect pedals 
 AKG Wireless systems 
 Ultrasone headphones 
 Traveler Guitar

References

External links

Year of birth missing (living people)
Living people
American male guitarists
American multi-instrumentalists
American audio engineers
American vocal coaches
Record producers from New York (state)
Guitarists from New York (state)